Simon Williams (born 16 June 1946) is a British actor known for playing James Bellamy in the period drama Upstairs, Downstairs. Frequently playing upper middle class or aristocratic upper class roles, he is also known for playing Charles Cartwright in the sitcom Don't Wait Up and Charles Merrick in medical drama Holby City. Since 2014, he has played the character of Justin Elliott in the long-running BBC Radio 4 series The Archers.

Early life and education
Simon Williams was born in Windsor in 1946; his parents were actor Hugh Williams and actress and model Margaret Vyner. His sister Polly married his Don't Wait Up co-star and friend Nigel Havers. His brother is the poet Hugo Williams.

Williams was educated at Harrow School. He trained in repertory at Worthing, Birmingham and Bath, and later joined the Theatre Workshop.

Career
Williams has appeared on stage in many productions, and has also directed a number of plays. He first appeared on television in 1967 in Man in a Suitcase, and in 1969 played the lead role in Slim John. He got his big break in 1971 when he made his first appearance as James Bellamy in the Upstairs, Downstairs episode "Board Wages". Williams would go on to appear in 37 episodes until the penultimate episode "All the King's Horses" in 1975. Following this, he appeared in Wodehouse Playhouse. From 1979 to 1981, he played Laurence Lucas in Agony, a role he reprised in 1995 in Agony Again. His film career includes appearances in The Touchables (1968), The Breaking of Bumbo (1970), The Blood on Satan's Claw (1971), Three for All (1976), The Incredible Sarah (1976), Jabberwocky (1977), The Uncanny (1977), The Odd Job (1978), and the Peter Sellers films The Prisoner of Zenda (1979), and The Fiendish Plot of Dr. Fu Manchu (1980). He also played Nigel Pennington-Smythe in the TV reunion film Return of the Man from U.N.C.L.E. (1983). In 1996, he voiced the Bishop in The Willows in Winter.

In 1981, he played Buddo in the TV series Kinvig. In 1985, Williams replaced Richard Heffer to play Dr. Charles Cartwright in the sitcom Don't Wait Up, a role Williams continued for three series until 1990. In the meantime, he had also appeared in Juliet Bravo, the Doctor Who serial "Remembrance of the Daleks" as Group Captain Gilmore, Minder, and the pilot of The Alleyn Mysteries, in which he played Roderick Alleyn. He also was a guest star on the television series Cluedo where he played murder victim Mr. Chapman.  He was a celebrity player on Pass the Buck on Christmas Eve 1986.

Williams also played Captain Hastings in several BBC Radio 4 adaptations of Agatha Christie novels, starring John Moffatt as Hercule Poirot.

Williams has appeared in episodes of Bergerac, Dangerfield, dinnerladies, The Scarlet Pimpernel, Dalziel and Pascoe, Bad Girls, The Inspector Lynley Mysteries, Starhunter 2300, Cutting It, Heartbeat, Family Affairs, Doctors, The Bill, Diamond Geezer 2, Kingdom and First Among Equals.  In 1992 Williams starred in the series The Mixer, his co-star was Jeremy Clyde of Chad & Jeremy fame, and appeared as Charles Elliot in the 1997 film The Opium War. Williams has also had recurring roles as Gerald Trigg in Law and Disorder in 1994 and Sir Charles Merrick in Holby City from 2000 to 2003. In 2000, he appeared on BBC Radio's Just a Minute. In 2002 he appeared in the film The Gathering Storm, and has also appeared in the Doctor Who audio drama Nekromanteia. In 2008, he appeared in an episode of the BBC spy series Spooks as bank owner Sir Francis Denham. In 2009, Williams returned to the fictional world of Holby to make a one-off appearance in Casualty as Professor de Silva, the father of junior doctor Toby de Silva. In 2010, he appeared as Lord Godwyn in the television series Merlin in the episode "The Changeling".

In 2010, Williams contributed to the CD We Will Remember Them, published by the Royal British Legion, where he read three of the poems. Williams has also written two novels, Talking Oscars and Kill the Lights, and has written several plays. In early November 2007, he performed in Curtain up! Lights up! Cock up! at the Jermyn Street Theatre near Piccadilly Circus in London.

Williams has served the Actors' Charitable Trust and Denville Hall for more than 30 years, including 15 years as joint chairman with Angela Thorne. He has donated his time and expertise to the Sir Terence Rattigan Charitable Trust, the King George V Fund for Actors and Actresses, and several other charities.

Williams made a guest appearance in the fourth season of the Canadian series Murdoch Mysteries, in 2011. The episode was entitled "Downstairs, Upstairs" in honour of the actor's famous role.

Williams has appeared in the audio series Counter-Measures and its follow-up The New Counter-Measures. He has also appeared in a stage adaptation of Chariots of Fire (2012), in the BBC television series Father Brown (2015), in BBC One soap EastEnders (2017), in Alan Bennett's play Allelujah (2018), as Stanton in the ghost story  Martin's Close for the BBC, in the BBC television series Shakespeare & Hathaway: Private Investigators (2020), and as Joe Biden in the play The 47th by Mike Bartlett (2022).

Personal life
Williams married actress Belinda Carroll, with whom he had two children, Tam and Amy, both actors. They divorced. In 1986 he married actress Lucy Fleming, the daughter of Peter Fleming and Celia Johnson and the niece of James Bond creator Ian Fleming.

References

External links
Simon Williams at the British Film Institute

1946 births
Living people
English dramatists and playwrights
English male dramatists and playwrights
English male film actors
English male television actors
English male voice actors
Fleming family
People educated at Harrow School
People from Windsor, Berkshire